Luule Tull (born on 16 October 1942 in Eisma) is an Estonian motorcycle racer.

During her career she become 42-times Estonian champion in different motorcycle racing disciplines. 1975–1992 she won 9 times Kalev Great Race.

In 1971 she was named to Estonian Athlete of the Year.

References

Living people
1942 births
Estonian motorcycle racers
Female motorcycle racers
People from Haljala Parish